Somo, SoMo, or SOMO may refer to:

Places
In the United States
Somo, Kentucky, unincorporated community
Somo, Wisconsin, town

Elsewhere
Somo, Mali, commune

Rivers
Somo River, river in Wisconsin, United States

Music
SoMo (born 1987), American recording artist
SoMo (album), 2014 album by SoMo

Acronyms
State Organization for Marketing of Oil, Iraqi company
Singly Occupied Molecular Orbital, in chemistry
Centre for Research on Multinational Corporations (SOMO), Dutch non-profit organisation

See also
Somos (disambiguation)